One Way Ticket is a 2008 Indian Malayalam-language film by Bipin Prabhakar starring Prithviraj Sukumaran and  Bhama in lead roles and Mammootty in a cameo appearance.

Plot
Kunjappu aka Jahangir is a jeep-driver who is a die-hard fan of Mammootty and also is the General Secretary of the Malappuram District unit of the Mammootty Fans’ Association. His family consists of his mother and three sisters, two of whom are married. They all want to see Kunjappu married and so a marriage-broker named Beeran is behind him in finding a match for Kunjappu.

Kunjappu has an uncle who keeps a distance from Kunjappu and his family. He has a young daughter called Sajira. To irritate this uncle, Kunjappu always goes about saying that he would marry only Sajira. The uncle takes it seriously and to prevent this from happening, he helps Beeran find more and more girls for Kunjappu, but he rejects all the proposals brought by Beeran.

In the meantime Kunjappu goes to attend a wedding and there he sees a girl called Raziya singing the Oppana. He tells his family that he is in love with Raziya, and that he intends to marry her. His uncle learns about this from Beeran and is happy. Preparations for the marriage begins. And then one day Kunjappu goes to Raziya’s college to meet her. And there he learns that it Raziya is a different girl and the girl he fell in love was Sunanda. Sunanda has an uncle named Karunakaran Ezhuthachchan. He and his son Sasi intend to grab Sunanda’s property and assets. Situations become worse from there and the 'Mega Star' Mammootty himself, had to intervene to solve the issues.

Cast

References

External links
 

2008 films
2000s Malayalam-language films
Films scored by Rahul Raj